Karthik Palaniapan Meiyappan (born 8 October 2000) is an Indian-born cricketer who plays for the United Arab Emirates national cricket team as a right-arm leg spin bowler. He made his One Day International (ODI) debut for the UAE in 2019 and also represented the UAE at the 2020 Under-19 Cricket World Cup.

Personal life
Meiyappan was born in Chennai, India. He grew up in Chennai, Abu Dhabi and Dubai, before his family settled in Dubai permanently in 2012. He attended The Winchester School, Jebel Ali, alongside his UAE teammate Aryan Lakra.

Career
Meiyappan captained the United Arab Emirates national under-19 cricket team at the 2019 ACC Under-19 Asia Cup in Sri Lanka, having also played at the 2018 ACC Under-19 Asia Cup in Bangladesh.

In December 2019, he was named in the One Day International (ODI) squad for the 2019 United Arab Emirates Tri-Nation Series. He made his ODI debut for the UAE, against the United States on 8 December 2019. Later the same month, he was named in the UAE's squad for the 2020 Under-19 Cricket World Cup. In December 2020, he was one of ten cricketers to be awarded with a year-long part-time contract by the Emirates Cricket Board.

In October 2021, he was named in the UAE's Twenty20 International (T20I) squad for the 2021 Summer T20 Bash tournament. He made his T20I debut on 8 October 2021, for the UAE against Ireland.

He was named in UAE's squad for the 2022 ICC Men's T20 World Cup in Australia. In his team's second match of the group stage of the tournament against Sri Lanka, he took a hat-trick by dismissing Bhanuka Rajapaksa, Charith Asalanka, and Sri Lankan captain Dasun Shanaka. This was the first T20I hat-trick by a UAE player, the fifth at a T20 World Cup, and the first hat-trick taken by a player from an ICC associate member against an ICC full member.

References

External links
 

2000 births
Living people
Emirati cricketers
United Arab Emirates One Day International cricketers
United Arab Emirates Twenty20 International cricketers
Cricketers from Chennai
Indian emigrants to the United Arab Emirates
Indian expatriate sportspeople in the United Arab Emirates
Sportspeople from Dubai